The Leader of the Opposition (officially the Leader of Her Majesty's Most Loyal Opposition in the British Virgin Islands) is the leader of the largest political party in the House of Assembly that is not in government.

Under the Constitution the Governor is required to appoint a member of the House of Assembly recommended by a majority of the elected members of the House who are members of any opposition party whose numerical strength in the House is greater than that of any other opposition party, or if no such person exists, the member of the House of Assembly who in the judgement of the Governor is best able to command the support of the members of the House in opposition to the Government.

Prior to the introduction of the current Constitution, which codified the position, the Leader of the Opposition, by convention, led the largest party which is not part of the government: where one party wins outright this is the party leader of the second largest political party in the House of Assembly.  However, in 1990 Cyril Romney was appointed Leader of the Opposition as an Independent and in 1995 Walwyn Brewley was appointed despite leading the party with the third largest number of seats.  The Leader of the Opposition is normally viewed as an alternative Premier.

On 6 May 2022 Julian Fraser was appointed as the most recent leader of the opposition.

Overview 
To date a total of fourteen people (all men) have served as Leader of the Opposition - over twice the number who have served as Premier or Chief Minister.  Every person who has served as Chief Minister or Premier has also served as Leader of the Opposition at some point.  No person has ever served consecutive terms as Leader of the Opposition.  

On five occasions has the Leader of the Opposition changed between elections: 
 In 1977, when Austin Henley died.
 In 1988, when Ralph O'Neal left the United Party to join the Government.
 In 2017, when Andrew Fahie ousted Julian Fraser as leader of the opposition Virgin Islands Party.
 In 2018, when a split in the ruling government party led to Ronnie Skelton becoming the leader of the largest non-Government party.
 In 2022 when the opposition National Democratic Party joined the Virgin Islands Party in a unity government, and left Julian Fraser as the member of the House of Assembly who was not in either party or in Cabinet.

2015 deadlock and controversy 
In 2014, whilst Ralph O'Neal was Leader of the Opposition he stepped down as leader of the Virgin Islands Party in favour of Julian Fraser.  However O'Neal remained the official Leader of the Opposition under the Territory's constitution until he stood down in subsequent general election in June 2015.  In that election only two members of the opposition Virgin Islands Party won their seats - Julian Fraser and Andrew Fahie.  Subsequently Fraser and Fahie argued over who should be named as Leader of the Opposition; Fahie believed he commanded majority support within the party and should take over as party leader following the general election defeat.  As the Constitution required that the Leader of the Opposition commanded a support of the "majority" of the opposition members, and the only two opposition members disagreed, there was an impasse.  Governor John Duncan gave the men a month to resolve their differences, but they were unable to do so, and eventually the Governor appointed Fraser as the official Leader of the Opposition.  Fahie would later oust Fraser as party leader, and would then be appointed as Leader of the Opposition in his stead.

Leaders of the Opposition from 1967 
Prior to 1967 politicians were not elected on a party political basis, and thus Leaders of the Opposition only came into being with the introduction of party politics and Ministerial rule after the 1967 general election.

The following is a list of the Leaders of the Opposition in the British Virgin Islands from 1967 to date.

Party affiliations are as follows:
VIP—Virgin Islands Party
NDP—National Democratic Party
CCM—Concerned Citizens Movement
PVIM—Positive Virgin Islands Movement
VIDP—VI Democratic Party (defunct)
UP—United Party (defunct)
PU—Progressives United

Footnotes

Opposition leaders
British Virgin Islands